Patchogue is a station of the Montauk Branch of the Long Island Rail Road in the village of Patchogue, New York. It is on Division Street between West Avenue (Suffolk County Road 19) and South Ocean Avenue. The station is located in the Patchogue-Medford Union Free School District.

Ferries to Fire Island board from a port near the station.

History

Between 1869 and 1879 Patchogue station was the east end of the South Side Railroad of Long Island. It even had spurs and roundhouses between West and Railroad Avenues, as well as another spur between River Avenue and West Avenue for the textile plant that more recently has served as the Patchogue Campus of Briarcliffe College.  Prior to acquisition by the Long Island Rail Road there was a proposal by the SSRRLI to extend the main line southeast towards Bellport, then northeast to Brookhaven and Southaven. The station in Brookhaven was to be named "Fireplace" after Fireplace Neck. The station was rebuilt in 1889 and again on July 30, 1963. As part of the 1963 reconstruction, Railroad Avenue was terminated at Sephton Street, along the north side of the tracks, and the baggage and express house was torn down for additional parking. When Blue Point station was closed by the Long Island Rail Road in 1980, former Blue Point commuters opted to use Patchogue station. A high-level platform was constructed in the late 1990s.

PD Tower
 
In 1912, the Long Island Rail Road added a control tower to Patchogue Station on South Ocean Avenue, for both the Montauk Branch and the former trolley line owned by the Suffolk Traction Company. The tower was designated by the LIRR as the "PD Tower" and was also used for hooping. In 1970, all switches and crossing were automated, but hooping continued. At this point, the tower's structure began to decline. Residents began referring to it as the "Leaning Tower of Patchogue." On August 23, 2006 the tower was finally torn down. Today, a flower garden can be found where the tower used to stand.

Station layout
The station has one six-car-long high-level platform on the south side of the two tracks; the north track, not next to the platform, is a siding.

Connections
Suffolk County Transit buses S40, S54, S61, S63, S66, S68, 7A, and 7B.
Patchogue's local jitney bus routes
Passenger ferries to Davis Park and Watch Hill on Fire Island.

References

External links

PD Tower (Unofficial LIRR History Website)
Older Patchogue Station(Newsday)
Original Patchogue Station (Arrt's Arrchives)
Patchogue Village Bus
Railfan Recollections at LIRR  "PD" Tower and signals (TrainsAreFun.com) 
More PD Tower Pics (May 1, 2006)
Unofficial LIRR Photography Site (lirrpics.com)
Patchogue Station
 PD Interlocking and The Leaning Tower of Patchogue (The LIRR Today) 
 Station from Ocean Avenue from Google Maps Street View

Long Island Rail Road stations in Suffolk County, New York
Railway stations in the United States opened in 1869
Patchogue, New York
1869 establishments in New York (state)